Ramgarh Assembly constituency may refer to 
 Ramgarh, Bihar Assembly constituency
 Ramgarh, Jharkhand Assembly constituency
 Ramgarh, Rajasthan Assembly constituency